José Eduardo da Silva Barbosa Alves (born 24 March 1981 in Vila Nova de Famalicão, Braga District), known as José Eduardo, is a Portuguese former footballer who played as a goalkeeper.

External links

1981 births
Living people
People from Vila Nova de Famalicão
Portuguese footballers
Association football goalkeepers
Liga Portugal 2 players
Segunda Divisão players
FC Porto B players
Portimonense S.C. players
FC Pampilhosa players
C.D. Aves players
F.C. Penafiel players
FC Progresul București players
Liga Leumit players
Hapoel Jerusalem F.C. players
Cypriot Second Division players
Akritas Chlorakas players
APOP Kinyras FC players
Portugal youth international footballers
Portuguese expatriate footballers
Expatriate footballers in Romania
Expatriate footballers in Israel
Expatriate footballers in Cyprus
Portuguese expatriate sportspeople in Romania
Portuguese expatriate sportspeople in Israel
Portuguese expatriate sportspeople in Cyprus
Sportspeople from Braga District